California Nights is the third studio album by American rock duo Best Coast. It was released on May 1, 2015, by Harvest Records. It was produced by Wally Gagel, who also produced the duo's 2013 EP Fade Away.

The band announced the album along with tour dates and the release of a "dreamlike" video directed by Adam Harding for the title track, which also served as the lead single. On the band's official website, singer-songwriter Bethany Cosentino described the band's approach to the making of the album, stating: "In LA, there's a real darkness that you don't see unless you know where to look. That's a theme we very consciously decided to explore and play with when making this record. We related to the idea that things may look or sound fun and upbeat, but they may not actually always be that way."

A video for second single "Heaven Sent" directed by Lana Kim and Cosentino was released on April 1, 2015. Third single "Feeling Ok" followed in mid-April, which the duo performed on Conan on May 5. "In My Eyes" was serviced to US alternative radio on February 23, 2016, as the album's fourth single.

Two outtakes from the album sessions, "Late 20s" and "Bigger Man", were released on an exclusive Record Store Day release in April 2016.

Critical reception

California Nights has received generally positive reviews from music critics. At Metacritic, which assigns a weighted mean rating out of 100 to reviews from mainstream critics, the album has received an average score of 69 based on 26 reviews, which indicates "generally favorable reviews".

Track listing

Personnel
Credits adapted from the liner notes of California Nights.

Best Coast
 Bethany Cosentino – guitar, vocals
 Bobb Bruno – guitar, bass, keyboards

Technical
 Wally Gagel – production, recording, mixing
 Seth Olansky – assistance
 Vincent Silva – assistance
 Howie Weinberg – mastering
 Gentry Studer – mastering assistance

Additional musicians
 Brady Miller – drums, guitar, percussion, keyboards
 Wally Gagel – percussion, bass synthesizer, keyboards, guitar

Artwork
 Janell Shirtcliff – photography
 Lawrence Azerrad – design

Charts

Release history

References

2015 albums
Best Coast albums
Harvest Records albums